Ľuba Lesná (born 21 March 1954) is a contemporary Slovak investigative journalist, filmmaker, novelist, and playwright. While her earlier work focused on plays, since Czechoslovakia's Velvet Revolution she has worked primarily as a journalist, writing also several books and a novel, Prípad medička (The Medical Student Case), being rewritten as a play. Lesná worked with Prime Minister Iveta Radičová, as an analyst in the Slovak Office of the Government from 2010-2012.

Education
 Faculty of Arts, Comenius University, Bratislava

Professional Biography
 Verejnosť newspaper, deputy chief editor
1990-1992: Czechoslovak public television
1992-1997: Radio Free Europe, reporter & political analyst
1997-2002: Slovak Television, reporter & political talk show host
2004-2005: Joj Television
2006-2009: The Slovak Spectator, reporter & political affairs writer
2010-2012: Office of the Government, Slovak Republic, analyst

Books

Non-fiction

 Únos prezidentovho syna, alebo, Krátke dejiny tajnej služby [The Kidnapping of the President's Son, or a Short History of the Secret Service] (1998). Bratislava: GMT. 
 Únos demokracie. Zo zákulisia slovenskej tajnej služby [The Abduction of Democracy. The Slovak Secret Service Backstage] (2001). Prague: G plus G; and Bratislava: Institute for Public Affairs (IVO).

"two ... books about the most famous cases linked to the country’s intelligence service (SIS) between 1994 and 1998"

 Radičová, Iveta, and Ľuba Lesná. Krajina hrubých čiar [Country of Full Stops] (2013). Bratislava: Ikar.  

Fiction

 Prípad medička [The Medical Student Case] (2007), a novel. Bratislava: Petrus. 

"...based on a real murder committed in 1976. The book is a grotesque picture of the totalitarian system in the former Czechoslovakia."

"In the 1980s a young doctor was killed and 8 people arrested for murdering her ... But a question remains – what really happened?"

Film

Únos demokracie [The Abduction of Democracy] (2002), documentary, with Mário Homolka, director

"...a documentary film about the 1995 abduction of Michal Kováč, Jr., son of the former Slovak president..., which some believe was carried out by allies of former Prime Minister Vladimir Meciar within the SIS secret service."

Plays 
Skamenelina [The Fossil] (1986) -- for radio
Klytaimnéstra [The Klytaimnéstra] (1988)
Báthoryčka [Madame Báthory] (1988)
Slová, slová, slová [Words, words, words] (1988)

Awards

The Czechoslovak Egon Erwin Kisch Prize for non-fiction, 1999, for Únos prezidentovho syna [The Kidnapping of the President's Son] 
Investigative Journalism Award, for courage, 2007, Institute for Public Affairs (IVO), Slovak Republic
First Place, Slovak Journalism Awards, 2007, Slovak Syndicate of Journalists (for "Cervanová Witnesses Break 30-Year Silence", The Slovak Spectator, December 18, 2006)
Second Place, Slovak Journalism Awards, 2009, Slovak Syndicate of Journalists (for "Border Killings Remain Unpunished Decades Later", The Slovak Spectator, October 13, 2008)

Reviews

"The novel Prípad medička [The Medical Student Case] is and is not about the actual murder of medical student Ľudmila Cervanová. It is, because Ľuba Lesná became familiar with this affair over a long period of time and discovered many facts and a lot of information used in the book. And it is not, because the novel is written as a literary fiction about the abduction and murder of a character, medical student Alena Hronská. Why did the famous author of non-fiction books (The Abduction of the President's Son, The Abduction of Democracy) not stick to pure facts this time? And why did she decide to risk telling her own version of this affair? Because, as she says herself in the book's introduction, according to pure facts and documents it should be clear to readers that this case did not take place the way that official police and judicial versions described it. The question — so what happened? — remains unanswered." (Martin Mojžiš, .týždeň )

"Just make sure nobody ever finds out what really happened. I have borrowed this sentence from Ľuba Lesná’s book, Prípad medička (Petrus Publishers, 238 pp)... One can’t help asking — could all this really be true? Because, if the murder of the medical student really happened the way the author describes it (and I hasten to add that personally I find it quite plausible) why has the truth not prevailed? The answer is probably in the times we live in, in our reality that easily turns lies into truth... While reading Ľuba Lesná’s latest book I could not get the first sentence from Péter Esterházy out of my head: 'It’s bloody hard to lie if one does not know the complete truth.' And I don’t mean the book’s 'heroes', the ŠtB officers... Luckily, the medical student’s sad story reminds us that the truth, even if revealed only in part, has the power to awaken our conscience, albeit painfully, with adrenaline throbbing in our veins. That is why politicians and many public officials consider it an unwanted commodity." (Štefan Markuš, SME)

"'The time is not yet right for me to speak the truth about the medical student’s case, he said in his unforgettable sonorous voice...' I quote from the book Prípad medička by Ľuba Lesná, inspired — quite openly — by Ľudmila Cervanová’s murder. Although it is a work of fiction, the author cannot hide the fact that she is a journalist par excellence, or her extraordinary personal commitment to uncovering the centre of the disgusting octopus, the nerve centre of an operation that entangled and destroyed six innocent lives. Ľuba Lesná seems to have intimate knowledge of all these horrors and because 'the time is not yet right' for the truth to come out, she had to do it herself, by turning Cervanová’s case into fiction. I salute you, Mrs. Lesná!..." (Lucia Piussi, .týždeň)

"If the adversary in a detective story is a simpleton, the discovery of his identity is rarely pleasurable for the reader... The author of the novel demonstrates on a broad scale that everything in this case was fabricated by the communist intelligence service (ŠtB). All the ambitious investigator wanted to do was to indict as many young people as possible and he couldn't care less whether they were guilty or not, or if they had the means to commit the crime or not. Eventually the reader finds out that everything boils down to the so-called Arab link—the terrorist training facility for Arab students at Piešťany airport." (Michal Schuster, Knižná revue)

References

External links
The Slovak Spectator
Works by Ľuba Lesná (WorldCat)

1954 births
Living people
Slovak journalists
Slovak women journalists
Slovak dramatists and playwrights
20th-century Slovak women writers
20th-century Slovak writers
Comenius University alumni
Film people from Bratislava
Women dramatists and playwrights
21st-century Slovak women writers
21st-century Slovak writers
Writers from Bratislava